A jobless recovery or jobless growth is an economic phenomenon in which a macroeconomy experiences growth while maintaining or decreasing its level of employment.  The term was coined by the economist Nick Perna in the early 1990s.

Causes
Economists are still divided about the causes and cures of a jobless recovery: some argue that increased productivity through automation has allowed economic growth without reducing unemployment. Other economists state that blaming automation is an example of the luddite fallacy and that jobless recoveries stem from structural changes in the labor market, leading to unemployment as workers change jobs or industries.

Industrial consolidation
Some have argued that the recent lack of job creation in the United States is due to increased industrial consolidation and growth of monopoly or oligopoly power. The argument is twofold: firstly, small businesses create most American jobs, and secondly, small businesses have more difficulty starting and growing in the face of entrenched existing businesses (compare infant industry argument, applied at the level of industries, rather than individual firms).

Population growth vs. employment growth 

In addition to employment growth, population growth must also be considered concerning the perception of jobless recoveries. Immigrants and new entrants to the workforce will often accept lower wages, causing persistent unemployment among those who were previously employed.

Surprisingly, the U.S. Bureau of Labor Statistics (BLS) does not offer data-sets isolated to the working-age population (ages 16 to 65). Including retirement age individuals in most BLS data-sets may tend to obfuscate the analysis of employment creation in relation to population growth. Additionally, incorrect assumptions about the term, Labor force, might also occur when reading BLS publications, millions of employable persons are not included within the official definition. The Labor force, as defined by the BLS, is a strict definition of those officially unemployed (U-3), and those who are officially employed (1 hour or more).

The following table and included chart depicts year-to-year employment growth in comparison to population growth for those persons under 65 years of age. As such, baby boomer retirements are removed from the data as a factor for consideration. The table includes the Bureau of Labor Statistics, Current Population Survey, for the Civilian noninstitutional population and corresponding Employment Levels, dating from 1948 and includes October 2013, the age groups are 16 years & over, and 65 years & over. The working-age population is then determined by subtracting those age 65 and over from the Civilian noninstitutional population and Employment Levels respectively. Isolated into the traditional working-age subset, growth in both employment levels and population levels are totaled by decade, an employment percentage rate is also displayed for comparison by decade.

When examined, by decade, the first decade of the 2000s, the United States suffered a 5% jobless rate when compared to the added working age population.

See also
 Deindustrialization
 Involuntary unemployment
 Lost Decade (Japan)
 Structural unemployment

Notes and references

External links 
 Exploding Productivity Growth: Context, Causes, and Implications

Impact of Automation
Universal basic income
Economic growth
Unemployment
Unemployment in the United States